Trol or similar, may refer to:

 News from the Republic of Letters (TRoL), literary journal
 The Review of Litigation (TROL), University of Texas student magazine
 "T.R.O.L." (story), a 2009 Doctor Who comic story; see Tenth Doctor comic stories

See also

 
 AK Trolls, state-sponsored pro-AKP anonymous online political commentators in Turkey
 Troll (disambiguation)